The Mampuwordu Sands are a geologic member or phase from the middle to late Miocene.

References

Miocene Series
Geologic formations of Australia
Geology of South Australia